Carmen Arnold-Biucchi is a classical numismatist and archaeologist. Born in Lugano, Switzerland, she studied classical archaeology and ancient history at the University of Fribourg, Switzerland, receiving her Magister in 1971. Her dissertation (received 1976) was on Cypriot terracottas. She is an expert on the coinages of Greek Sicily and Hellenistic numismatics.

Arnold-Biucchi worked at the American Numismatic Society from 1982 to 2002, before becoming the Damarete curator of ancient coins at the Harvard Art Museums in 2002. She retired in 2019.

Academic career 
Carmen worked as a numismatic research associate from 1974–1977 at the Lexicon Iconographicum Mythologiae Classicae in Basel and later at the Lexicon's US Center at Rutgers University. In 1982 she moved to the American Numismatic Society (ANS) as the Greek and Roman curatorial assistant. She was assistant curator of ancient coins at the ANS from 1984 to 1989. In 1989 she became the first Margaret Thompson curator of Greek coins. While working at the ANS Arnold-Biucchi taught the graduate summer seminar (1982–1999).

Carmen worked as an adjunct Professor at Columbia University (1995), Bryn Mawr (2000), and CUNY (2001), Visiting Professor at the Università degli Studi di Padova, Italy (1993), and at the EPHE of the Sorbonne in Paris (2007). In 2001–2002 she was the J. Clawson Mills Art History Fellow at the Metropolitan Museum of Art. In 2004 she was the Robinson Visiting Scholar at the Ashmolean Museum and Kraay Fellow at Wolfson College, Oxford.

In 2002 Carmen Arnold Biucchi became the Damarete curator of ancient coins at the Harvard Art Museums. She was located in the Department of Ancient & Byzantine Art & Numismatics, and was also a Lecturer in Classics. While curator Carmen organized, digitized, cataloged and promoted the numismatic collection.

In 2003 Carmen became the secretary of the International Numismatic Council, serving as president between 2009 and 2015.

Awards 

 2012: Gunnar Holst Numismatic Foundation Medal
 2014: Jeton de Vermeil of the French Numismatic Society
 2022: Medal of the Royal Numismatic Society UK

Books 

 (1990) The Randazzo Hoard and Sicilian Chronology in the Early Fifth Century BC. New York.
 (2006) Alexander's Coins and Alexander's Image. Boston.
 (2014) (with M. Beckmann) (eds). Sculpture and Coins: Margaret Bieber as Scholar and Collector. Loeb Classical Monographs.

Other publications 

 (1988) (with L. Beer-Tobey and N.M. Waggoner) 'A Greek archaic silver hoard from Silenus', American Numismatic Society Museum Notes 33, 1-35.
 (1991) 'Arabian Alexanders', in  W.E. Metcalf (ed.), Mnemata: Papers in Memory of Nancy M. Waggoner, New York, 99-115.
 (1992) 'A new coin of the Serdaioi (?) at the ANS', in M. Price, A. Burnett and R. Bland (eds), Essays in Honour of Robert Carson and Kenneth Jenkins, London, 1-3. 
 (2002) 'Some remarks on the coinages of South Italy and Etruria and those of Cyprus in the archaic and classical period', Numismatica e antiche classiche 31, 45-67.
 (2007) (with A.-Peter Weiss) 'The river god Alpheios on the first tetradrachm issued of Gelon at Syracuse', Numismatica e antiche classiche 36,  59-74.
 (2008) 'Syracusan Dekadrachms revisited', Numismatische Zeitschrift 116/117, 13-28

References

External links
A fuller list of publications can be found on her CV.

University of Fribourg alumni
Columbia University faculty
Swiss archaeologists
Swiss numismatists
Swiss curators
Living people
Year of birth missing (living people)